New York State Route 36 (NY 36) is a north–south state highway in the western part of New York in the United States. Along the way, NY 36 passes through the villages of Canisteo, Dansville, Mount Morris, Caledonia, and Churchville and the city of Hornell. The section of the route between Dansville and Mount Morris closely parallels Interstate 390 (I-390); however, from Dansville south and Mount Morris north, NY 36 serves as a regionally important highway, connecting to I-86, U.S. Route 20A (US 20A), US 20, and I-490 as it heads north. At its south end, NY 36 connects to Pennsylvania Route 249 (PA 249).

The origins of NY 36 date back to 1908 when most of modern NY 36 between Jasper and Mumford was assigned a legislative route designation by the New York State Legislature. NY 36 was assigned in the mid-1920s to an alignment extending from Hornell north to Avon, utilizing its modern alignment south of Mount Morris and what is now NY 63 and NY 39 from Mount Morris to Avon. It was truncated in 1927 to end in Geneseo, but was subsequently realigned and extended as part of the 1930 renumbering of state highways in New York to continue north from Mount Morris to Ogden. NY 36 was extended again, this time southwestward to Andover, in the early 1940s, but was realigned just a decade later to continue southeast from Hornell to the Pennsylvania state line.

Route description

Steuben County
NY 36 begins at the Pennsylvania state line in Troupsburg, where it continues south into Pennsylvania as PA 249. NY 36 joins NY 417 here, following the east–west route to the western fringe of the community. At a T-intersection just outside the hamlet, the two routes split, with NY 417 turning to the right (eastward) toward Corning and NY 36 making a left-hand turn to continue northward toward the town of Canisteo. Across the town line, NY 36 turns toward the northwest and serves the hamlet of South Canisteo, which marks the southern end of both Colonel Hills Creek and a valley formed by the waterway.

The route continues generally northerly through the creek valley to the outskirts of the village of Canisteo, where the creek valley gives way to a larger one surrounding the nearby Canisteo River. At this point, NY 36 curves sharply to the northwest, passing over Colonel Hills and Bennetts Creeks prior to entering the village as Main Street. In the center of Canisteo, it intersects the northern terminus of NY 248. Past NY 248, the route leaves the village and continues northwest along the lightly populated banks of the Canisteo River to the city of Hornell, which NY 36 traverses by way of a divided highway built  to bypass Hornell along its western edge. (Prior to construction of this arterial and the new Canisteo-Hornell route, NY 36 followed Dineen and McBurney Roads north of Canisteo, along an abandoned and unenlargeable stretch along the Canisteo River, entering Hornell via Canisteo Street.) NY 36 heads north through the residential southern half of the city to Hornell's commercial central district, the site of a junction with Main Street and NY 21.

(Prior to the construction of the arterial, these routes ran along Seneca Street in Hornell and Seneca Road in North Hornell.) NY 21 breaks from NY 36 and proceeds to the northeast along an unnamed road; NY 36, however, continues along the bypass to I-86 and NY 17, where the two roads meet at I-86 and NY 17 exit 34 via a full cloverleaf interchange. Past the interchange, the divided highway narrows into a two-lane, undivided highway that continues through lightly populated areas of the town to the village of Arkport.

In Arkport, NY 36 intersects the eastern terminus of NY 961F, a reference route erroneously signed as a touring route, at West Avenue. Formerly, this intersection hosted the southern terminus of NY 70, which originally followed what is now NY 961F northwest to Canaseraga. North of Arkport, the Canisteo River makes a turn to the west while NY 36 continues to the northeast, running along the eastern edge of both a marshy area and an extension of the Canisteo River valley. From here northward, the highway takes on a more northeasterly routing as it crosses the northwest corner of the county, where it runs along the west side of Stony Brook State Park and briefly enters the park before emerging from the area just south of the Livingston County line.

Livingston County

Across the county line, NY 36 enters the town of North Dansville and the village of Dansville located within. At the southern village line, NY 36 meets the southbound entrance and exit ramps for I-390 at exit 4 and gains the name Clara Barton Street. Due to the angle at which I-390 crosses NY 36 here, the northbound entrance and exit ramps are located another  to the north. The route follows Clara Barton Street north into the village center, where it gradually curves northeastward ahead of a junction with Main Street (NY 63) in Dansville's business district. NY 36 turns northwest here, following NY 63 along Main Street for two blocks before returning west on Ossian Street. The highway turns again just six blocks later to follow Dock and Franklin streets northwest toward Dansville Municipal Airport. Ossian Street, meanwhile, continues west as NY 436, which passes under I-390 a short distance to the west.

Between NY 436 and I-390 exit 6 near Groveland, NY 36 closely parallels I-390, remaining within  or less of it for the entire distance. Just outside Dansville in the shadow of Dansville Municipal Airport, NY 36 connects to I-390 a second time by way of McWhorter Road and exit 5. Outside of Dansville, the highway heads northwestward across gradually less developed areas as it traverses the west side of a wide, flat valley known locally as the flats. Not far to the northwest is I-390 exit 6, the third and final meeting between I-390 and NY 36.

NY 36 continues on, passing through the hamlet of Sonyea and serving the Groveland Correctional Facility on its way into the town of Mount Morris and the village of the same name, where it becomes Main Street in the latter. It continues through the mostly residential community to the business district in the heart of the village, which NY 408 enters from the southwest on Chapel Street and leaves to the northeast on State Street. In between Chapel and State streets, NY 36 and NY 408 overlap for one block along Main Street. Immediately north of Mount Morris, NY 36 passes through the northern tip of Letchworth State Park and crosses the Genesee River, which separates the towns of Mount Morris and Leicester. As the route heads north into Leicester, it begins to leave the flats in favor of a more northwesterly alignment that leads it into the village of Leicester.

Now named Mount Morris Road, NY 36 enters the east side of the small village, intersecting with U.S. Route 20A (US 20A) and NY 39 at Main Street. NY 36 turns west onto Main Street, joining US 20A and NY 39 for one block in order to reach York Road, which carries the route out of the village and across sparsely populated areas to the York hamlet of Greigsville, centered on the highway's second junction with NY 63. After another  of open, rural surroundings—save for the hamlet of York at the midpoint of the segment—NY 36 has a junction with US 20 in the hamlet of Fraser. The route continues on, eventually reaching the sprawling village of Caledonia, where the route joins with NY 5 for three blocks along Main Street. At the village's center, NY 36 turns north onto North Street, which carries the highway through the northern fringe of the village and into Monroe County.

Monroe County

Across the county line from Caledonia is the Wheatland hamlet of Mumford, where NY 36 crosses over the Rochester and Southern Railroad—which the highway has loosely paralleled since Dansville—and Oatka Creek prior to meeting the southern terminus of NY 383. While the railroad, the creek, and NY 383 all head east to Scottsville, NY 36 continues to the north on Riga–Mumford Road, passing through isolated areas of the towns of Wheatland and Riga. Along this stretch, it passes over the New York State Thruway (I-90) a short distance south of the Wheatland–Riga town line. The route continues into the hamlet of Riga, where it intersects and briefly overlaps with NY 33A westward along Chili–Riga Center Road. At Churchville–Riga Road, NY 36 leaves NY 33A to resume its northward trek toward the village of Churchville.

North of this point, NY 36 becomes South Main Street as it enters the southern portion of Churchville. The highway proceeds into the village's central business district, centered on the junction of Main and Buffalo streets, the latter designated as NY 33. NY 36 turns east at Buffalo Street, joining with NY 33 for nine blocks on Buffalo Street as both routes cross over Black Creek and approach the eastern fringe of Churchville. Here, NY 36 turns north once more to follow Washington Street into the town of Ogden. The route continues through the mostly rural town toward the hamlet of Adams Basin, located west of Spencerport and east of Brockport. NY 36 ends at the latter intersection; however, Washington Street continues north as County Route 212 to serve Adams Basin and the nearby Erie Canal.

History
Like many New York State highways, NY 36 was not designed at one time as a single route; it consists of pieces of various projects later cobbled together and relabeled or renumbered.

In 1908, the New York State Legislature created Route 15, an unsigned legislative route that initially extended from Hornell in the south to Caledonia in the north via Dansville and Mount Morris. Also assigned at this time was Route 16, which went from Cuba to Rochester via Le Roy and Caledonia. Much of Route 15 followed modern NY 36; however, from Dansville to Mount Morris, it used what is now NY 63 and NY 408 instead. Route 16, meanwhile, followed current NY 36 from Caledonia to Mumford. From Jasper to Hornell, modern NY 36 was part of the cross-state Route 4. In 1911, special legislation routed a new Buffalo–Elmira–Binghamton–New York City route, to be built by the state, along what is now NY 36 between Hornell and Canisteo, and from there to Addison. On March 1, 1921, Route 16 was truncated to end in Le Roy. Its former routing north of Caledonia became part of Route 15.

NY 36 was assigned in the mid-1920s to an alignment extending from Hornell in the south to Avon in the north. The route utilized the routing of legislative Route 15 from Hornell to Dansville and from Mount Morris to Shakers Crossing, the modern junction of NY 63 and NY 408 northeast of Mount Morris. Between Dansville and Mount Morris, NY 36 followed its current alignment. Past Shakers Crossing, NY 36 continued northward through Geneseo to Avon on modern NY 63 and NY 39. The Geneseo–Avon segment of NY 36 became part of US 20 when that route was assigned in 1927. South of Hornell, what is now NY 36 from Hornell to Jasper became part of NY 17 when that route was assigned to most of legislative Route 4 in 1924. The remaining sections of contemporary NY 36—from Jasper to the Pennsylvania state line and north of Mount Morris—were state-maintained but unnumbered.

In the 1930 renumbering of state highways in New York, the segment of modern NY 36 from Hornell south to the Pennsylvania state line became the southernmost portion of NY 21. At the same time, NY 36 was realigned north of Mount Morris to follow the path of former legislative Route 15 north through Caledonia to Mumford. Past Mumford, NY 36 continued north on its modern alignment to a new terminus at NY 3 (now NY 31) south of Adams Basin. In the early 1940s, NY 36 was extended south through Hornell and Almond to Andover, replacing part of NY 17F. The routings of NY 36 and NY 21 south of Hornell were swapped in the early 1950s, placing both routes on their current alignments south of the city.

On June 8, 2017, Governor of New York Andrew Cuomo announced that they would upgrade the intersection of NY 531 and NY 36. This would improve the connection between NY 531 and NY 31 for safety purposes. Instead of the abrupt end at NY 36, a new road would be constructed to connect NY 531 and NY 31. NY 31 would be widened from Gallup Road to NY 531; a center median would be added and a portion of NY 31 between NY 531 and NY 36 would become a cul-de-sac for the residences in the area. NYSDOT projects that the job would be completed by the end of 2018.

NY 36A

NY 36A was an alternate route of NY 36 between Dansville and Mount Morris. The route began at NY 36 in Dansville and passed through Groveland on its way to the vicinity of Mount Morris, where it ended at a junction with NY 63 northeast of the village. NY 36A was assigned as part of the 1930 renumbering of state highways in New York and supplanted by a realigned NY 63 in December 1940.

Major intersections

See also

References

External links

036
Transportation in Monroe County, New York
Transportation in Livingston County, New York
Transportation in Steuben County, New York